The Drug King is a 2018 South Korean crime drama film written and directed by Woo Min-ho. It stars Song Kang-ho as Lee Doo-sam, an ordinary small-time narcotics dealer who becomes an infamous drug lord in Korea during the 1970s. The film also features Jo Jung-suk as a prosecutor from Seoul who is intent on taking Lee down and Bae Doona as a lobbyist who guides Lee into the upper levels of drug dealing. Other cast members include Kim Dae-myung, Kim So-jin, Lee Hee-joon, Jo Woo-jin and Yoon Je-moon. The film was released on December 19, 2018.

Plot
True life story of Lee Doo-sam (Lee Hwang-soon), a drug smuggler building his empire in Busan's crime underworld in the 1970s. Lee was originally a member of the Chilsung faction in Busan from Hwanghae Province. In the early 1970s, he smuggled diamonds and other products, and eventually expanded it to drugs for domestic distribution, and exported it to Japan as well, thus accumulating huge amounts of wealth in the process.

Cast

Main
Song Kang-ho as Lee Doo-sam (Hangul: 이두삼, I Du-sam), a Korean drug lord from Busan, South Korea and the main protagonist of the film.
Jo Jung-suk as Kim In-goo (Hangul: 김인구, Gim In-gu), a lawful prosector and the main rival of Lee Doo-sam.
Bae Doona as Kim Jeong-ah (Hangul: 김정아, Gim Jeong-a), a powerful socialite, lobbyist and Doo-sam's lover.

Supporting

Kim Dae-myung as Lee Doo-hwan (Hangul: 이두환, I Du-hwan), Lee Doo-sam's younger cousin and fellow drug trafficker  
Kim So-jin as Sung Sook-kyung (Hangul: 성숙경, Seong Sug-gyeong), a preacher's daughter and Lee Doo-sam's wife. 
Lee Hee-joon as Choi Jin-pil (Hangul: 최진필, Choe Jin-pil), a boat captain, smuggler, and an ally-turned-main rival of Lee Doo-sam drug empire 
Jo Woo-jin as Jo Seong-kang (Hangul: 조성강, Jo Seong-gang), a gangster boss and leader of a powerful Korean mafia
Yoon Je-moon as Kim Soon-pyung (Hangul: 김순평, Gim Sun-pyeong/Nihongo: キム・スンピョン, Kimu Sunpyon), a Zainichi Korean Yakuza boss based in Osaka, Japan and an associate of Hideki
Yoo Jae-myung as Chief Kim, a detective who leads an operation against Doo-sam's drug empire 
Lee Joong-ok as Yoon Kang-shik (Hangul: 윤강식, Yun Gang-sig)
Choi Deok-moon as Director Goo
Song Young-chang as UN Ambassador, a corrupt Korean ambassador of UN who is implied be a gangster. 
Kim Hae-gon as Baek Woon-chang (Hangul: 백운창, Baeg Un-chang)
Park Ji-hwan as Wang Moon-ho (Hangul: 왕문호, Wang Mun-ho/Chinese: 王文浩, Wáng Wénhào), a Sino Korean drug trafficker and a member of Doo-sam's drug gang 
Lee Bong-ryun as Lee Doo-sook (Hangul: 이두숙, I Du-sug)
Choi Gwi-hwa as Chief Ham
Park Kyung-hye as Lee Kyung-ja (Hangul: 이경자, I Gyeong-ja)
Keijiro Matsushima as Hideki (Nihongo: 秀樹, Hideki), a yakuza gangster from Osaka, Japan.

Special appearance
Na Kwang-Hoon as Seo Soo-Gon (Hangul: 서수곤, Seo Su-gon/Nihongo: ソ・スゴン, So Sugon), the Zainichi Korean yakuza boss in Kobe, Japan
Tetsu Watanabe as Chairman Jin (Nihongo: ジン会長, Jin kaichō), a yakuza boss from Tokyo, Japan
Lee Sung-min as Seo Sang-hoon (Hangul: 서상훈, Seo Sang-hun)
Kim Hong-fa as Professor Baek, an enigmatic and legendary meth maker.

Production 
Principal photography began on May 5, 2017. Filming was completed on October 10, 2017.

Awards and nominations

References

External links
  
 
 

2018 films
South Korean crime drama films
2018 crime drama films
Showbox films
South Korean biographical drama films
Films about drugs
Films set in the 1970s
Films set in Busan
2018 biographical drama films
Yakuza films
Zainichi Korean culture
Biographical films about criminals
2010s Japanese films
2010s South Korean films